Johan Kriek was the defending champion, but did not participate this year.

Andre Agassi won the title, defeating Jeff Tarango 6–2, 6–4 in the final.

Seeds

  Andre Agassi (champion)
  Slobodan Živojinović (quarterfinals)
  Paul Annacone (first round)
  Derrick Rostagno (second round)
  Yahiya Doumbia (semifinals)
  Sammy Giammalva Jr. (quarterfinals)
  Barry Moir (quarterfinals)
  Matt Anger (quarterfinals)

Draw

Finals

Top half

Bottom half

External links
 Main draw

Singles